The 1926 Marshall Thundering Herd football team was an American football team that represented Marshall College (now Marshall University) in the West Virginia Athletic Conference during the 1926 college football season. In its second season under head coach Charles Tallman, the team compiled a 5–4–1 record, 3–1 against conference opponents, and outscored opponents by a total of 150 to 99.

Schedule

References

Marshall
Marshall Thundering Herd football seasons
Marshall Thundering Herd football